Exiguobacterium profundum is a Gram-positive, halotolerant, facultative anaerobic, moderately thermophilic and non-spore-forming bacterium from the genus of Exiguobacterium which has been isolade from a hydrothermal vent from the East Pacific Rise.

References

Bacillaceae
Bacteria described in 2007